William Henry Webster Stevenson (9 June 1878 – 15 August 1945) was an Anglican bishop.

History 
Stevenson was educated at Sydney Grammar School and the University of Sydney before beginning his ordained ministry as a curate at Castle Hill, New South Wales. After further curacies at Darlinghurst, Randwick and Wimbledon, he became an incumbent at Windsor, Queensland and Fortitude Valley. He was Warden of St John's College, University of Queensland and then Principal of St Francis’ Theological College, Brisbane. Later he was Archdeacon of Brisbane, then Bishop of Grafton from his 24 August 1938 consecration (at St Andrew's Cathedral, Sydney until his death.

References

1878 births
People educated at Sydney Grammar School
University of Sydney alumni
Anglican archdeacons in Australia
Anglican bishops of Grafton
20th-century Anglican bishops in Australia
1945 deaths
Archdeacons of Brisbane